The Castielertobel Viaduct is a single track railway bridge spanning the Castielertobelbach, and linking the municipalities of Castiel and Calfreisen, in the Canton of Graubünden, Switzerland. It was built between 1913 and 1914 for the Chur–Arosa railway, and is now owned and used by the Rhaetian Railway.

Location
The viaduct is located on the Rhaetian Railway's metre gauge line from Chur to the holiday and recreation resort of Arosa (the Chur–Arosa line), and links Calfreisen with Castiel, just to the west of the Lüen-Castiel railway station.

After the Langwieser Viaduct and the Gründjitobel Viaduct, the Castielertobel Viaduct is the third largest bridge on the Arosa line.  It spans the Castielertobel, a wild and deeply eroded Bündner schist gorge, and the Castielertobelbach.  In similar fashion to the Landwasser Viaduct on the Rhaetian Railway's Albula Railway, the viaduct leads directly into a tunnel portal, where the Arosa line dives into the 249 m long S-shaped Bärenfalle-Tunnel.

History

The original stone bridge
Due to the difficult geological conditions in the Schanfigg valley, a total of 18 tunnels and 40 bridges needed to be created between 1912 and 1914 for the privately built Arosa line.

Like most of the other bridges on the line, the Castielertobel Viaduct was constructed in the classical manner, and mainly of stone.  However, the special site conditions dictated the inclusion of stampfbeton (unreinforced concrete compressed by stamping) in the cores of the stone pillars.

In light of the spectacular, and topographically extremely difficult, rises and falls of the Castielertobel (the so-called Bärenfalle, or bear traps, which, despite being relatively close to the nearby cantonal road, were almost unknown before the Arosa line was constructed), the engineers had to resort to using fire and smoke signals to help them survey the line's route.  During construction of the viaduct, access was provided to the construction site from Sassal via Calfreisertobel, on makeshift tracks laid over the already completed railway formation. Horses pulled the necessary materials to the construction site on transporter wagons.

The construction of the Bärenfalle-Tunnel was begun from Eichwald, uphill from Castiel.  The tunnel constructors made their breakthrough while both of the viaduct's pillars were still under construction.

Despite the viaduct's construction challenges, the viaduct building process itself was surprisingly trouble free: although the main pillars were begun only in April 1913, the whole viaduct, including its deck, was complete by November of the same year.  By contrast, a potential rock fall at the uphill portal of the Bärenfalle-Tunnel threatened to block passage through the tunnel just at the moment when transport of machinery to the Lüen power station was due to begin.

Stabilisation and reconstruction measures
Relatively quickly, this led to considerable deformation of the vaulting.

In 1931, following many observations and detailed investigations, work therefore began on an initial reconstruction of the viaduct. The work was carried out by the firm B. & C. Caprez. During that work, the valley side abutment was underpinned by a bell-shaped concrete block, which was clad with Hunziker stones, and reinforced with rails.

It soon turned out that these measures were not sufficient.  In 1942, the entire bridge structure was therefore rebuilt.  All three of the stone arches were removed and replaced by iron girders, to overcome the viaduct's previous vulnerability to landslides and associated deformations.  Installation of underlying "fish-bellied" girders maximised stability. Chief engineer Hans Conrad headed up this startling transformation, without any need for the railway operations to be interrupted.

Since the completion of the 1942 reconstruction, its special design has compensated for slipping movements, which cannot be eliminated, even by modern engineering measures. Both piers of the viaduct are regularly reviewed to detect irregularities immediately. A monitoring device attached to the viaduct makes it possible to register even the slightest shifts. Additionally, a  counterweight suspended from a wire rope provides a  pulling effect on the pier heads, along the line of the railway formation towards Chur.

Technical data
The viaduct has a total of three spans.

See also

Arch bridge
Truss bridge
Viaduct
Lüen-Castiel (Rhaetian Railway station)
Gründjitobel Viaduct
Langwieser Viaduct
Chur–Arosa railway
Rhaetian Railway

Notes

References

 See also the list of references in Castielertobel-Viadukt (de Wikipedia)

External links

 
 

Bridges completed in 1914
Bridges completed in 1942
Buildings and structures in Graubünden
Rhaetian Railway bridges
1914 establishments in Switzerland
20th-century architecture in Switzerland